Andrew Fraser Read FRS is Evan Pugh professor of biology and entomology at Pennsylvania State University and the Director of the Huck Institutes of the Life Sciences.

Education
Read was educated at the University of Otago where he was awarded a Bachelor of Science degree in 1984. He moved on to the University of Oxford where he was awarded a Doctor of Philosophy degree in 1989 for research supervised by Paul H. Harvey.

Awards and honours
Read was elected a Fellow of the Royal Society (FRS) in 2015. His certificate of election reads:

References

Living people
Fellows of the Royal Society
Year of birth missing (living people)
British biologists